Malcolm Bruce Slater (born 22 October 1939) was a Scottish former professional footballer, who played as a winger. A product of the Highland League club Buckie Thistle, Slater played in the Scottish Football League for Celtic and Montrose, the English Football League for Southend United, Leyton Orient and Colchester United. He also played non-league football in both Scotland and England for Inverness Caledonian of the Highland League, and Folkestone Town of the English Southern League at that time.

References

External links
 
 Malcolm Slater at Colchester United Archive Database

1939 births
Living people
People from Buckie
Scottish footballers
Association football wingers
Celtic F.C. players
Montrose F.C. players
Southend United F.C. players
Leyton Orient F.C. players
Colchester United F.C. players
Caledonian F.C. players
Scottish Football League players
English Football League players
Folkestone F.C. players
Buckie Thistle F.C. players
Sportspeople from Moray